Adiverukal is a 1986 Indian Malayalam-language social problem film directed by P. Anil (in his directorial debut) and written by T. Damodaran from a story by Peruvanthanam Sukumaran. It was produced by Mohanlal and Century Kochumon under the company Chears Films. The film stars Mohanlal, Karthika, Sukumari and Jagathy Sreekumar. The film has musical score and songs composed by Shyam.

Plot 

This is a film about fighting against exploitation of forest through poaching animals, illegally logging trees, cultivating cannabis, etc.

Cast

Mohanlal as Balakrishnan
Karthika as Sreedevi
Sukumari as Saraswathi Amma
Jagathy Sreekumar as Koshy Cheriyan
Suresh Gopi as Jayachandran
Mukesh as Ranger Sibi Varghese
Thilakan as Raghava Panicker
Nedumudi Venu
Rohini as Annakutti
Augustine as Sathyan, Manager
Babu Namboothiri as Josephkutty
Jagannatha Varma as Unnithan
Kundara Johnny as Kootuvadi Vasu
Kunjandi as Mooppan
Kuthiravattam Pappu as Kelu Nair
CI Paul as Forest Conservator Vishwanathan
Priya as Selvi
Bastian Vinayachandran as Vinayan
Vijayan Peringodu as M.L.A Kuriakose
Thodupuzha Vasanthi as Thresia

Production
Adiverukal was the directorial debut of P. Anil, who was the associate director of I. V. Sasi. The ecotourism area Thenmala in Kollam district was the filming location. The elephant used in the film was brought from Thrissur. Mohanlal escaped from the elephant attack several times while filming.

Soundtrack
The music was composed by Shyam and the lyrics were written by Bichu Thirumala.

References

External links
 

1986 films
1980s action thriller films
1980s Malayalam-language films
Films shot in Kollam